The Mountaineers may refer to:
 The Mountaineers (club), an American mountaineering club
 The Mountaineers (band), a Welsh pop group
 The Mountaineers (opera), an English romantic opera by Guy Eden and Reginald Somerville
 The Mountaineers (film), a 1924 silent German film directed by Arnold Fanck